The Climate Solutions Caucus is a bipartisan caucus of U.S. legislators supported by the Citizens' Climate Lobby whose members work to achieve action addressing the risks from climate change. The House of Representatives and Senate each have a caucus. The House caucus was founded in February 2016, during the 114th Congress, by Representatives Carlos Curbelo (R-FL) and Ted Deutch (D-FL). The Senate Caucus was founded in 2019 by Senators Mike Braun (R-IN) and Chris Coons (D-DE).

On November 27, 2018, House caucus members Ted Deutch (D-FL), Francis Rooney (R-FL), Charlie Crist (D-FL), Brian Fitzpatrick (R-PA), and John Delaney (D-MD) introduced the Energy Innovation and Carbon Dividend Act (HR 763), which would implement a national carbon fee and dividend. It had also been introduced in the Senate in 2018 as S. 3791.

The 2018 midterm elections illustrated a growing partisan divide over climate, and several incumbent Republican members of the Caucus lost their seats. One study concluded that this showed limited value for GOP members in pursuing bipartisan climate action.

Mission 
According to Co-Chair Deutch's House website, the mission of the Caucus in the House is: to educate members on economically-viable options to reduce climate risk and to explore bipartisan policy options that address the impacts, causes, and challenges of our changing climate.

House members, 116th Congress 

Membership of the caucus was previously restricted to consist of equal representation of Republicans and Democrats, but after the 2018 United States House of Representatives elections, this rule was loosened. In the 116th Congress, the  members are as follows:

Senate members, 116th Congress 
The Senate Climate Solutions Caucus was announced by Senators Mike Braun (R-IN) and Chris Coons (D-DE) on October 23, 2019. The two Senators wrote in an op-ed announcing the caucus:
  

The Climate Solutions Caucus in the Senate is bi-partisan, the rules of the caucus require that new members may only join with a member of the opposite party to ensure that the number of Democrats and Republicans stays the same. All actions by the caucus require unanimous agreement among the members.
The caucus membership for the 116th Congress is as follows (independent Angus King (I-ME) caucuses with the Democrats):

See also
Citizens' Climate Lobby
Friends Committee on National Legislation
Problem Solvers Caucus

References

Climate change organizations based in the United States